Bratislava bridgehead is found in the western part of Slovakia. It has an area of 93,7 square km. It is situated on the Little Hungarian Plain, on the left bank of the river Danube. Administratively, it belongs to the district Bratislava V in Bratislava, and has 111,135 inhabitants.

History
As a result of the Treaty of Trianon - the peace treaty by Hungary that ended its role in First World War - a bridgehead was created for Czechoslovakia on the right bank of river Danube at Bratislava, mainly for defensive purposes. At this time Petržalka was transferred to the newly founded country.

In October 1938, as part of  Munich Agreement, Petržalka and Devín were transferred to Nazi Germany for strategical purposes.

At the end of World War II, ceasefire agreements mainly restored the pre-war boundaries, except a small part of Carpathian Ruthenia, which became part of Ukraine as per the Moscow Agreement. A camp for Hungarians and Germans impeached for war crimes was located in Petržalka.

It was an idea of the Czechoslovakia delegation at the Paris Peace Conference that they would need an extended defensive territory at the Bratislava bridgehead. They sought Dunacsún (Čunovo), Horvátjárfalu (Jarovce), Oroszvár (Rusovce), Rajka and Bezenye. The first three were transferred, creating a territory of  62 km².

During the 1970s, a microdistrict was built at Petržalka, with a population of 100,000 inhabitants. Today its four villages are a part of the Bratislava V district.

Between 1977 and 1992, the Gabčíkovo–Nagymaros Dams was built there. The bridgehead makes the extraction of water to Slovakia possible.

References

Geographic history of Slovakia
History of Bratislava
Geography of Bratislava